Repenomamus (Latin: "reptile" (reptilis), "mammal" (mammalis)) is a genus of opossum- to badger-sized gobiconodontid mammal containing two species, Repenomamus robustus and Repenomamus giganticus. Both species are known from fossils found in China that date to the early Cretaceous period, about 125-123.2 million years ago. R. robustus is one of several Mesozoic mammals for which there is good evidence that it fed on vertebrates, including dinosaurs, though it is not possible to determine if it actively hunted live dinosaurs or scavenged dead ones. R. giganticus is among the largest mammals known from the Mesozoic era.

Classification and discovery 

The fossils were recovered from the lagerstätte of the Yixian Formation in the Liaoning province of China, which is renowned for its extraordinarily well-preserved fossils of feathered dinosaurs. They have been specifically dated to 125–123.2 million years ago, during the Early Cretaceous period.

Repenomamus is a genus of triconodonts, a group of early mammals with no modern relatives. R. robustus was described by Li, Wang, Wang and Li in 2000, and R. giganticus was described by Hu, Meng, Wang and Li in 2005. The two known species are the sole members of the family Repenomamidae, which was also described in the same paper in 2000. It is sometimes alternatively listed as a member of the family Gobiconodontidae; although this assignment is controversial, a close relationship to this family is well-founded.

Description

These finds extend considerably the known body size range of Mesozoic mammals. In fact, Repenomamus was larger than several small sympatric dromaeosaurid dinosaurs like Graciliraptor. Features of its shoulder and legs bones indicate a sprawling posture as in most of small to medium sized living therian mammals, with plantigrade feet. Unlike therian mammals, Repenomamus had a proportionally longer body with shorter limbs.

Paleobiology

Features of the teeth and jaw suggest that Repenomamus were carnivorous and a specimen of R. robustus discovered with the fragmentary skeleton of a juvenile Psittacosaurus preserved in its stomach represents the second direct evidence that at least some Mesozoic mammals were carnivorous and fed on other vertebrates, including dinosaurs; a recorded attack on an Archaeornithoides by a Deltatheridium predates its description. Speciations towards carnivory are known in eutriconodonts as a whole, and similarly large sized species like Gobiconodon, Jugulator and even Triconodon itself are thought to have tackled proportionally large prey as well; evidence of scavenging is even assigned to the former.

Like most other non-placental mammals, Repenomamus had epipubic bones, meaning that it gave birth to or laid eggs that hatched into undeveloped young like modern marsupials and monotremes.

See also

 Mammaliaformes
 Cynodonts
 Cynognathus
 Evolution of mammals

References

External links 

 "Prehistoric badger had dinosaurs for breakfast". Michael Hopkin. Nature.com. January 12, 2005.
 "Fierce mammal ate dinos for lunch". BBC News. January 12, 2005.

Cretaceous mammals
Eutriconodonts
Early Cretaceous mammals of Asia
Fossil taxa described in 2000
Yixian fauna
Taxa named by Jinling Li
Taxa named by Wang Yuan
Taxa named by Yuanqing Wang
Taxa named by Chuankui Li
Prehistoric mammal genera